Newark Township is a township in Wilson County, Kansas, United States.

History
Newark Township was established in 1871. It was named after Newark, Ohio.

References

Townships in Wilson County, Kansas
Townships in Kansas